Xolotl may refer to:
 Xolotl, an Aztec and central Mexican deity associated with lightning and death
 King Xolotl, a semi-legendary 13th century Chichimec leader
 Codex Xolotl, a pictographic codex from Central Mexico, recounting a traditional history of the Valley of Mexico